Stipa barbata is a species of perennial grass native to southern Europe, North Africa, and the Levant in the Mediterranean Basin, and temperate Asia.

The plant is a bunchgrass with:
culms that are 30–60 cm long
leaf blades are flexuous, filiform, conduplicate or involute.
leaf blades are 15–30 cm long by 1–2 mm wide.

References
 GBIF entry
 Flora Atlantica sive Historia Plantarum, quae in Atlante... 1:97, t. 27. 1798.

External links

 GrassBase - The Online World Grass Flora — (kew.org)
 USDA Plants Profile: Stipa barbata 

barbata
Bunchgrasses of Africa
Bunchgrasses of Europe
Bunchgrasses of Asia
Flora of North Africa
Flora of Western Asia
Flora of Lebanon
Plants described in 1798